The Homorod is a right tributary of the river Homorodul Nou in Romania. It discharges into the Homorodul Nou near Hrip.

References

Rivers of Romania
Rivers of Satu Mare County